The Kennywood Entertainment Company was the operator of five United States amusement parks in Western Pennsylvania, Connecticut, and New Hampshire.

History
Kennywood Entertainment Co. was effectively created in 1906, when F. W. Henninger and Andrew McSwigan bought the Kennywood amusement park from the Mellon family's Monongahela Railway Company. The two families controlled the park until they sold it in 2007. In 1983, they acquired Idlewild Park from the MacDonald family, who had owned it since 1952. Before the MacDonalds took over Idlewild, it had also been owned by the Mellon family. In 1989, they opened Sandcastle Waterpark just a few miles from Kennywood. They acquired Lake Compounce in Bristol, Connecticut, in 1996, and Story Land in Glen, New Hampshire in 2007.

On December 11, 2007, Kennywood Entertainment announced that it would selling all five of its amusement parks to Parques Reunidos, a Madrid, Spain-based company. Since 2009, Palace Entertainment, the American subsidiary of Parques Reunidos, has taken over the role formerly filled by Kennywood Entertainment.

Amusement parks
Idlewild and Soak Zone, in Ligonier, Pennsylvania
Kennywood, near Pittsburgh in West Mifflin, Pennsylvania
Lake Compounce, in Bristol, Connecticut
Sandcastle Waterpark, also near Pittsburgh in West Homestead, Pennsylvania
Story Land, in Glen, New Hampshire

References

Defunct companies based in Pennsylvania
Parques Reunidos
American companies established in 1906
Companies disestablished in 2007
1906 establishments in Pennsylvania
2007 disestablishments in Pennsylvania